The Terek nase (Chondrostoma oxyrhynchum) is a species of freshwater fish in the family Cyprinidae.  It is distributed in rivers of the western Caspian Sea basin, in Azerbaijan and Russia.  It prefers fast-flowing waters in the foothill and mountain ranges, with rocky or gravel bottoms.

References 

 
 

Chondrostoma
Fish described in 1877